State Road 181 (NM 181) is a  state highway in the US state of New Mexico. NM 181's southern terminus is at Interstate 25 Business (I-25 Bus.) in Truth or Consequences, and the northern terminus is at the end of state maintenance north of Truth or Consequences.

Major intersections

See also

 List of state roads in New Mexico

References

External links

181
Transportation in Sierra County, New Mexico